Amone Afu Fungavaka (born in Holonga, circa 1957) is a former Tongan rugby union player. He played as a hooker.

Career
His first cap for Tonga was during a match against Samoa, at Apia, on 25 August 1982. He also was part of the 1987 Rugby World Cup, where he played all the three pool stage matches in the tournament. His last international cap for Tonga was against Fiji, at Suva, on 29 August 1987.

Notes

External links

1957 births
Living people
Tongan rugby union players
Rugby union hookers
Tonga international rugby union players